Aleksandar Stanković, known as Alex M. Stanković, is a Serbian-born American engineer, currently at Tufts University and formerly holding the Inaugural Alvin H. Howell Endowed Professorship in Electrical Engineering and formerly Distinguished Professor at Northeastern University, and is an Elected Institute of Electrical and Electronics Engineers Fellow. He has studied at the University of Belgrade (holding B.S. and M.S.) and the Massachusetts Institute of Technology (holding Ph.D.).

References

Sources

External links

Tufts University faculty
Fellow Members of the IEEE
American electrical engineers
University of Belgrade alumni
Serbian emigrants to the United States
Serbian engineers
Massachusetts Institute of Technology alumni